Yoshihide is a masculine Japanese given name.

Possible writings
Yoshihide can be written using many different combinations of kanji characters. Here are some examples:

義英, "justice, hero"
義秀, "justice, excellence" 
義日出, "justice, sunrise" 
吉英, "good luck, hero"
吉秀, "good luck, excellence"
吉日出, "good luck, sunrise"
善英, "virtuous, hero"
善秀, "virtuous, excellence"
芳英, "virtuous/fragrant, hero"
芳秀, "virtuous/fragrant, excellence"
良英, "good, hero"
良秀, "good, excellence"
慶秀, "congratulate, excellence"
由秀, "reason, excellence"
与志英, "give, determination, hero"
嘉英, "excellent, hero"
嘉日出, "excellent, elegant boy"

The name can also be written in hiragana よしひで or katakana ヨシヒデ.

Notable people with the name
, Japanese samurai
, Japanese shōgun
, Japanese manga artist
, Japanese volleyball player
, Japanese modern pentathlete
, Japanese general
, Japanese sprinter
, Japanese aviator
, Japanese fencer
, Japanese footballer
, Japanese composer and musician
, Japanese actor
, Japanese politician and Prime Minister of Japan

See also
7408 Yoshihide, a main-belt asteroid
Yoshi

Japanese masculine given names